Fifth Army may refer to:

Germany 
 5th Army (German Empire), a World War I field Army
 5th Army (Wehrmacht), a World War II field army
 5th Panzer Army
 5th Army (GDR), a Warsaw Pact field army in the Cold War to be activated in case of a war with NATO

Russia/USSR 
 5th Army (Russian Empire)
 5th Army (RSFSR)
 5th Army (Soviet Union)
 5th Combined Arms Army (Russian Federation)

Others 
 5th Army (Austria-Hungary)
 Fifth Army (Bulgaria)
 Fifth Army (Nationalist China), see 88th Division (National Revolutionary Army)
 Fifth Army (France)
 Fifth Army (Japan)
 Fifth Army (Ottoman Empire)
 Fifth Army (United Kingdom)
 Fifth United States Army
 Fifth Army (Italy)
5th Army (Kingdom of Yugoslavia)
 Special Frontier Force of India, during the Indo-Pakistani War of 1971